Pietro Carrera (July 12, 1573 – September 18, 1647) was an Italian chess player, historian, priest and author.

Biography 
Pietro Carrera born in Sicily, in Militello in Val di Catania (Province of Catania), located in the Valley of Noto; here he grew up in the old colony of San Vito. He was the son of Donna Antonia Severino (mother) and Mariano Carrera, a traditional craftsman who entered the priesthood after his wife's death. During his studies in the Seminario Diocesiano of Siracusa, he had the opportunity to visit many different Sicilian cities. As a result of his travels he met Paolo Boi, so-called "The Siracusan", in the town of Palermo during 1597.

After taking his vows, he first become the chaplain at the church of S. Maria della Stella and later of Francesco Branciforte's Court (the Prince of Pietraperzia and Marchese of Militello). During his stay at Branciforte's Court he became interested in chess, winning against Salvatore Albino the so-called "Beneventano" and against Geronimo Cascio. Cascio won against the famous but old Polerio. After developing a fond relationship with the Prince's wife, Lady Giovanna, he composed a short poem for her in Latin in hexameter form regarding chess. Only fragments of this poem, the title being "The Pessopedia", remain today.

In 1617 he wrote and published Il Gioco degli Scacchi (The Game of Chess), subdivided into eight books where "learning the rules, the odds, the endgames, the blindfold chess and a discussion about the true origins of chess in itself". This was the first book ever printed in Militello, on request of his patron Branciforte, by Giovanni Rosso from Trento; in this poem Carrera collected and elaborated in a systematic fashion information given by previous authors.

After the Prince of Branciforte's death in 1622, he moved to Messina, then to Canicattì and finally to Catania. Here in 1635, using an alias, he published the "Risposta di Valentino Vespaio contro l'apologia di Alessandro Salvio" ("Valentino Vespaio's answer against Alessandro Salvio's explanation"), where he debated the accusations and criticisms made against him from Salvio.

Famous and esteemed, he died on September 18, 1647 in Messina.

Carrera is also remembered as the inventor of chess variant (Carrera's chess) on an 8x10 chessboard, in which there were added two new pieces called the "Champion" (a combination of the moves of the tower (rook) and the knight) and "Centaurus" (a combination of the bishop and the knight); these innovations had more fame than the ones made by Piacenza and Marinelli.  It was a predecessor of Capablanca Chess.

He is not remembered as a great live player but as a master of theory and a great source of information regarding contemporary players of his time.

See also
 Chess piece relative value

References

1573 births
1647 deaths
People from Militello in Val di Catania
Writers from Sicily
Chess players from Sicily
17th-century chess players
Chess theoreticians
Italian chess writers
Sportspeople from the Province of Catania
Religious leaders from the Province of Catania